Peru is a country in South America.

Peru or El Peru may also refer to:

Places

United States
 Peru, Illinois
 Peru, Indiana
 Old Peru, Iowa, also called Peru
 Peru, Kansas
 Peru, Maine
 Peru, Massachusetts
 Peru, Missouri
 Peru, Nebraska
 Peru State College, in Peru, Nebraska
 Peru, New York
 Peru, Pennsylvania
 Peru, Vermont
 Peru, West Virginia
 Peru, Wisconsin, a town
 Peru, Portage County, Wisconsin, an unincorporated community
 Peru Township (disambiguation)

Elsewhere
 Peru, Iran, a village in Semnan Province, Iran
 Perú, La Pampa, Argentina, a village and municipality

Historical and archaeological
 The Spanish Viceroyalty of Peru, which existed from 1542 to 1824
 El Perú (Maya site), or Waka' a Maya archaeological site in Guatemala

People and characters 
 Bobby Peru, a deranged robber played by Willem Dafoe in the 1990 film Wild At Heart
 Coco Peru, American actor and drag performer
 Envy Peru, Dutch-Peruvian drag queen

Other uses 
 Perú (Buenos Aires Metro), a metro station in Buenos Aires
 El Perú (book), on the natural history of Peru, by Antonio Raimondi
 Peru (band), a three-piece indie rock band based out of Long Island, New York
 "Peru" (song), a 2021 single by Nigerian singer Fireboy DML
 Peru, a standard color name from the X11 color names with the hex RGB value of #CD853F

See also 

 Madeleine Peyroux, American jazz singer